Thomas G. Spahn (born July 30, 1955) is a three-time Emmy Award-winning composer, Synthesizer Programmer for the 1996 Grammy Award nominated album by Eartha Kitt, "Back in  Business", another Emmy Nomination in 2001 for Mastering Dizzy South America Tour, is an American musician  born in Park Forest, Illinois and currently residing in New York City. Spahn is a longtime musical director and arranger and has worked with numerous musicians and composers on myriad projects, performances and recordings.

Early life and education
Tom Spahn was born July 30, 1955 and raised in Park Forest, Illinois.  1954 his parents, Bob and Vickie Spahn started the Park Forest Conservatory with Chicago professional musicians like Linus Carroll, Art Hodes and Bill Tinkler teaching music.  In high school Jay Hoel, Cecil Gorey and Watt Jones promoted his music projects, a rock band, productions of Jesus Christ Superstar and Godspell.  Graduating from High School he was given a full scholarship to Southern Illinois University to play piano with the Big Band and then subsequently toured the country for two years with the Wright Brothers Show Band.  With them he started on the Mellotron and rose to pianist-Musical Director, through his many years of experience he has added the titles orchestrator, vocal coach, composer, producer and audio engineer.

Career
Arriving in New York City in 1975, he began his creative path by playing Blues Piano with Pearl Murray at 96th and 2nd. There he met Ramona Brooks and guided her through her first album produced by Manhattan Records, Neil Portnow and Charles Koppelman. with the Single "Skinnydippin".  In 1976, he started his artistic partnership with the legendary performer, Miss Eartha Kitt when he became her primary arranger and musical director for the next nine years.  He then met and began a long mentorship and friendship with the deeply respected Broadway orchestrator and vocal coach, Mr. Colin Romoff, who, among his many achievements, taught Gypsy to Merman and Sound of Music to Mary Martin, and rehearsed Marilyn Monroe singing "Happy Birthday, Mr. President" to President John F. Kennedy.

In addition to his work with Miss Kitt, he became the musical director and arranger for the famous cabaret act, Gotham. Historically, this was the first fully outed gay male trio that boasted of being “Equal Opportunity Employers” by introducing Tom as their heterosexual pianist - Gotham specialized in the great standards of the 1930s and 1940s.  A real top hat and cane team with an outrageous spin on staying alive in the ferocious world of the AIDS epidemic. To this day, the inner circle of the NY cabaret scene will lift their hats to Gotham.

In 1980 Tom produced Big Bird - Getting Ready for School for Sesame Records at the famous Nola Recording Studios with John Post engineering.  in 1985 Jim Czak & John Post invited Tom to operate Studio B at Nola Recording Studios, developing the MIDI studio as MIDI was starting with the Yamaha DX7 and the Kurzweil 250 Keyboards.

Over the years his relationship with Sesame Workshop, then Children’s Television Workshop, grew and he is very proud to have been a part of that family for the decades as an integral part of their musical department working with Joe Raposo, Dave Connor and recording vocal performances for the show at Media Sound and then Nola Recording.  Since 1996 Tom has worked on many of their toy franchise products starting with Tickle Me Elmo.  In the Sesame Workshop Recording Studios, he brings an expertise in all digital recording standards and master of high quality audio through low resolution chips.

Like most people in the entertainment industry, he is a multi-tasker.  While doing all the above he has composed and arranged original underscoring for continuing dramas like the Emmy Award-winning daytime serial, ABC’s All My Children and Guiding Light for Judy Rybak Supervising Producer.

Currently, he continues his work at Sesame Workshop, and has several projects in development, City of Light that he wrote with Beverly Ross, Hot Ice - with Michael Pace and Francesca James and works with Ray Kennedy (VP of Entertainment, USO - New York) arranging updated versions of the American classic and patriotic repertoire for the 60+ member USO Show Troupe that tour all over the world to support our service men and women in the military.

Discography
 1976 - Max's Kansas City 1976 - Fender Rhodes, ARP Synthesizer, Mini Moog for Phillip Rambow
 1978 - Ramona Brooks - Manhattan Records
 1980 - Mr. Men Album
 1981 - Sesame Street - Big Bird Getting Ready for School - Sesame Records
 1983 - Roger Hargreaves - Mr Men and Little Miss - Stories 1983
 1988 - Marlo Thomas - Free To Be...A Family
 1989 - Jorn Hoel - Love Will Make You do Things That You Know Is Wrong
 1991 - Blossom Dearie & Mike Renzi - Christmas Spice So Very Nice - Synthesizer
 1991 - Blossom Dearie & Mike Renzi - Tweedledum and Tweedledee - Synthesizer, Synthesizer Programming
 1992 - Christina Andreou - Opera Made Easy - MET Opera Bookstore
 1993 - K.T. Sullivan - Crazy World - Programming
 1993 - Aztec Two-Step - Of Age - Engineer, Keyboards
 1993 - Laurie Beechman - Time Between the Time - Synthesizer
 1994 - Eartha Kitt - Back in Business - Synthesizer, Programming
 1994 - Cynthia Crane	- Smoky Bar Songs for the No-Smoking Section - Mastering
 1995 - Cynthia Crane	- Blue Rendezvous - Mastering
 1995 - Bonnie Lee Sanders - Bonnie's Bway Moon Song Shoppe - Producer, Music Direction, Composer
 1995 - Barbara Carroll - Everything I Love - Editing
 1996 - Eartha Kitt - Back In Business
 1996 - Michael Callen - Legacy - The Healing Power of Love - Engineer
 1997 - Cynthia Crane - Cynthia's in Love - Mastering
 1997 - Mike Longo - I Miss You John - Mastering
 1997 - Mike Longo - New York '78 - Mastering
 1997 - Havana Carbo	- So I'll Dream You Again - Mastering
 1997 - Diahann Carroll - The Time of My Life	 - Mastering
 1998 - Joe Kennedy - Accentuate the Positive - Mastering
 1998 - Bonnie Lee Sanders - Seasoned Woman - Producer, Composer
 1998 - Joe Kennedy - Strings by Candlelight - Editing
 1998 - Sesame Street - Elmo’s Lowdown Hoedown - Recording - Sony Wonder CD) LK 63430
 1999 - Dizzy Gillespie - Con Alma: A Tribute to Dizzy Gillespie - Judy Rafat - Mastering
 2000 - Mike Longo - Explosion	- Editing, Mastering
 2000 - Judi Silvano - Songs I Wrote, Or Wish I Did - Mastering
 2000 - Joe McMahon Jr. - The Secondhand Heart for Sale: The Songs of Joe McMahon, Jr. - Engineer
 2001 - Dizzy Gillespie - Dizzy in South America: Official U.S. State Department Tour, 1956, Vol. 3	 - Mastering
 2001 - Great Cabaret Performances	- Synthesizer Programming
 2002 - Randy & the Rainbows - Play Ball - Engineer
 2002 - Lisa Richard - Virgin Tracks - Engineer
 2003 - Mike Longo - Live: The Detroit International Jazz Festival	- Engineer
 2003 - The 70s Soul Jam, Vol. 1	 - Mastering
 2003 - The 70s Soul Jam, Vol. 2 - Mastering
 2003 - The 70s Soul Jam, Vol. 3 - Mastering
 2005 - Kidz Bop Kids - A Very Merry Kidz Bop - Mastering
 I'm Confused Therefore, I Am - Cynthia Crane - Mastering

Videography
 Sid & Nancy, John Cale
 Something Wild, Jonathan Demme
 Mistress, Galt MacDermot/ Robert De Niro

Musicals
Spahn functioned a Musical Director and Orchestrator or Composer on numerous musicals, including the following:
 Battle of the Giants – by Alan Menken and Howard Ashman – Musical Director and Orchestrator
 Real Life Funnies – by Alan Menken and Howard Ashman – Musical Director and Orchestrator
 City of Light – Composer with Beverly Ross
 Cairo – Musical Director and Orchestrator
 Sam Gray – Musical Director and Orchestrator - Bonnie Sanders
 Broadway Moon – Musical Director and Orchestrator
 The Road to Hollywood, by Michael Pace & Rob Preston – Musical Director and Orchestrator

Vocal Coach
Over the years Spahn has been a vocal coach to the following notables

 Divine for "Hair Spray – The Movie"
 Eartha Kitt
 Nancy LaMott
 Ramona Brooks
 Gotham
 Ray Kennedy - FDR Drive

References

Living people
1955 births
Park Forest, Illinois
American male composers
20th-century American composers
American audio engineers
20th-century American pianists
American male pianists
21st-century American pianists
20th-century American male musicians
21st-century American male musicians